The Geoscope is a monumental display of rocks at the La Lozère motorway service at junction 32 of the A75 autoroute at Albaret-Sainte-Marie
in the department of Lozère, France. It is sometimes described as a geological museum. 45 stones, each weighing many tonnes and accompanied by an interpretive panel are artistically arranged in a circle in an old quarry.

Lozère
Geographically, Lozère can be divided up into 4 regions: Aubrac, Cévennes, Causses et Gorges, Margeride. The Geoscope displays rocks from each of these regions and attempts to explain their influence on the landscape.

Access
Access is from the A75, the RN 106 and RN 86.

References
 

Geology museums in France
Buildings and structures in Lozère
Outdoor sculptures in France
Tourist attractions in Lozère